Pedlow is a surname. Notable people with the surname include:

Cecil Pedlow (1934–2019), Irish rugby union player
Isaac Ellis Pedlow (1861–1954), Canadian politician

See Also
Pedlow Skate Park, skate park in Los Angeles